HNLMS Tromp (F803) (Dutch: "Zr. Ms. Tromp") is the second  of the Royal Netherlands Navy. The ship was laid down in 1999, launched in 2001, and commissioned in 2003. The frigate is named after Dutch naval heroes Maarten Tromp (1598–1653) and Cornelis Tromp (1629–1691).

As of 18 June 2010, Commander René Tas is HNLMS Tromps commanding officer.

Service history

Theatre Ballistic Missile Tracking Exercises, 2006
In November 2006, HNLMS Tromp participated in a live Theatre Ballistic Missile (TBM) Tracking Exercise (TRACKEX). The event took place on the Pacific Missile Range Facility off Hawaii. For the TRACKEX, Tromp was equipped with the experimental Extended Long Range (ELR) modification to its Thales Nederland SMART-L radar. During the exercise, a ballistic missile surrogate was launched from Kauai Island and was successfully tracked by HNLMS Tromp using its ELR-modified SMART-L radar. Another successful TRACKEX was held in December 2006.

Deployment to the Indian Ocean, 2010
Tromp deployed to the Indian Ocean off the coast of Africa as part of Operation Atalanta, which is composed of European Union naval units. The operation is tasked with suppression of piracy in the region.

On 14 March 2010, Tromp responded to a distress call from the transport ship , which was under attack from two pirate skiffs. Tromp launched her helicopter, which forced the whaler mother ship to stop. Tromp then sent a boarding party to secure the vessel. Crew from Tromp sank the mother ship, and confiscated satellite phones, AK-47s, a rocket launcher, and boarding equipment.

Three days later, on 17 March 2010, Tromp was involved in an incident with suspected pirates off the coast of eastern Africa. Two small boats approached the frigate at high speed. After realizing Tromp was a warship, the pirates fled. However, Tromp pursued and captured the two boats, along with a mother ship. The frigate destroyed the two boats and released the pirates to the mother ship, after it had been cleared of weapons.

On 5 April 2010, Tromp rescued the container ship MV Taipan by rappelling six Marines from its Lynx helicopter (under covering fire from the helicopter and Tromp) to the deck of Taipan, resulting in the capture of 10 pirates. The 13 crew (2 German, 3 Russian, 8 Sri Lankan) were unharmed having taken refuge in a secure location after stopping the ship's engines.

State Visit Norway, 2010
On 1 June 2010, Queen Beatrix visited Norway aboard Tromp for a 3-day state visit.

2011 Libyan civil war
On her return to her homeport in February 2011 through the Mediterranean, the ship was deployed to the Gulf of Sidra to potentially assist in the safe return of Dutch nationals during the 2011 Libyan civil war. While performing an evacuation mission near the town of Sirte, a Lynx helicopter and its three-man crew were captured by members of the Libyan Army. The Dutch engineer and Swedish woman they were trying to rescue were allowed to leave Libya; negotiations yielded the crew's release.

Exercise Formidable Shield 2017
Tromp along with sister ship  participated in Exercise Formidable Shield 2017 off the coast of Scotland. She fired an SM-2 missile and a RIM-162 ESSM at a supersonic target fired by US Air Force F-16 aircraft.

2022 Standing NATO Maritime Group 1
On 11 September 2022, Tromp departed Nieuwe Haven to join Standing NATO Maritime Group 1. This was the first deployment for Tromp since undergoing a midlife update from 2018 to 2021.

Gallery

See also
 APAR

References

External links
 
  Hr. Ms. Tromp, official website

2001 ships
Frigates of the Netherlands
De Zeven Provinciën-class frigates
Ships built in the Netherlands